Blackness is an area of the city of Dundee. Broadly, Blackness is located to the north of the city's West End and is centred on the Blackness Road, where a number of small, local shops are located. The presence of the Scouring Burn (now diverted underground) meant that the area was attractive for industrial development in the late eighteenth and early nineteenth centuries, modern steam powered machinery requiring a substantial water supply. Part of Blackness is a conservation area, noted for its "industrial and social significance ... fine mills [and] narrow cobbled streets". The Verdant Works is in Blackness.

The Brooksbank Centre in Blackness commemorates Mary Brooksbank, local resident, revolutionary and songwriter.

References

Areas of Dundee